Alan Rex Dufty (born 1947) is an Australian Paralympic athlete who won twelve medals at three Paralympics from 1984 to 1992.

Personal
Born in the Riverina region of New South Wales, Dufty moved to the Queensland town of Proserpine, to be with his wife, Olga, whom he married in 1970. He competed in rugby league, rugby union, and amateur boxing while living in New South Wales. In August 1973, he broke his back and became paraplegic after a motorcycle accident. He worked for the Shire of Proserpine from 1975 to 2003, at first as a parking inspector. He has served on the committees of many organisations related to disability and sport. In 2003, he won a by-election to select a councillor of the Whitsunday Shire Council after the previous holder of that position died suddenly, and he served out the remainder of her term. He and his family were the subject of a 1981 documentary that aired throughout Australia.

Competitive career

Dufty competed in wheelchair sport from 1976 to 1996. At the 1984 New York/Stoke-Mandeville Paralympics, he won two gold medals in the Men's 400 m 1C and Men's Marathon 1C events, two silver medals in the Men's 200 m 1C and Men's 4x200 m Relay 1A–1C events, and two bronze medals in the Men's 800 m 1C and Men's 4x100 m Relay 1A–1C events.

At the 1988 Seoul Games, he won two silver medals in the Men's 4x100 m Relay 1A–1C and Men's Marathon 1C events and two bronze medals in the Men's 1,500 m 1C and Men's 4x200 m Relay 1A–1C events. At the 1992 Barcelona Games, he won a silver medal in the Men's 4x100 m Relay TW1–2 event and a bronze medal in the Men's 4x400 m Relay TW1–2 event.

References

External links
Alan Dufty – Athletics Australia Results

Paralympic athletes of Australia
Athletes (track and field) at the 1984 Summer Paralympics
Athletes (track and field) at the 1988 Summer Paralympics
Athletes (track and field) at the 1992 Summer Paralympics
Medalists at the 1984 Summer Paralympics
Medalists at the 1988 Summer Paralympics
Medalists at the 1992 Summer Paralympics
Paralympic gold medalists for Australia
Paralympic silver medalists for Australia
Paralympic bronze medalists for Australia
Paralympic medalists in athletics (track and field)
Australian male wheelchair racers
People with paraplegia
Sportsmen from New South Wales
1947 births
Living people